UFC on Fox: Diaz vs. Miller (also known as UFC on Fox 3) was a mixed martial arts event held by the Ultimate Fighting Championship on May 5, 2012 at the IZOD Center in East Rutherford, New Jersey.

Background
Dennis Hallman was expected to face Tony Ferguson at the event, but Hallman was forced out of the bout with an injury and replaced by Thiago Tavares. Tavares himself was also forced from the bout with an injury and replaced by Michael Johnson.

Darren Uyenoyama was expected to face John Dodson at the event, but Uyenoyama was forced out of the bout and was replaced by promotional newcomer Tim Elliott.

Johnny Bedford was expected to face Nick Denis at the event, but Bedford was forced out of the bout with an injury and replaced by Roland Delorme.

During the official weigh ins, John Lineker failed to make the flyweight limit, coming in one pound over.  Lineker was fined and his bout with Louis Gaudinot was contested at a catchweight of 127 pounds.

Results

Bonus awards
Fighters were awarded $65,000 bonuses.

Fight of the Night:  Louis Gaudinot vs.  John Lineker
Knockout of the Night:  Lavar Johnson
Submission of the Night:  Nate Diaz

See also
List of UFC events
2012 in UFC

References

Fox UFC
2012 in mixed martial arts
Mixed martial arts in New Jersey
Sports competitions in East Rutherford, New Jersey
2012 in sports in New Jersey
Events in East Rutherford, New Jersey